Robert W. Parker is a retired major general in the United States Air Force.

Career
Parker joined the Air Force in 1963. Later that year, he was assigned to the 741st Strategic Missile Squadron at Minot Air Force Base and underwent training at Vandenberg Air Force Base.

He was stationed at Ellsworth Air Force Base from 1964 to 1969, when he returned to Vandenberg Air Force Base. The following year, he was reassigned back to Ellsworth. From 1972 to 1976, Parker was assigned to Strategic Air Command. He was then stationed at the Pentagon from 1976 to 1980.

In 1981, Parker was assigned to the 321st Strategic Missile Wing at Grand Forks Air Force Base. From there, he became Vice Commander of the 341st Strategic Missile Wing at Malmstrom Air Force Base. Later that year, Parker assumed command of the wing. The following year, he returned to Grand Forks Air Force Base to assume command of the 321st.

In 1987, Parker returned to The Pentagon as a member of the staff in the Office of the Chairman of the Joint Chiefs of Staff. The following year, he became Senior Military Adviser to the Director of the Arms Control and Disarmament Agency. From 1991 to 1993, he was Director of the On-Site Inspection Agency.

From 1993 to 1994, Parker was Director of Operations of Air Force Space Command. In 1994, he assumed command of the Twentieth Air Force at Francis E. Warren Air Force Base. Parker retired in 1996.

Awards he received during his career include the Defense Distinguished Service Medal, the Legion of Merit, the Airman's Medal, the Meritorious Service Medal with oak leaf cluster, the Air Force Commendation Medal with oak leaf cluster, the Joint Meritorious Unit Award, the Outstanding Unit Award, the Combat Readiness Medal and the National Defense Service Medal with service star.

Education
Saint Michael's College
Ohio State University
Northwestern University
John F. Kennedy School of Government - Harvard University
Squadron Officer School
Air Command and Staff College
Industrial College of the Armed Forces
Air War College

References

United States Air Force generals
Recipients of the Legion of Merit
Recipients of the Airman's Medal
Saint Michael's College alumni
Ohio State University alumni
Northwestern University alumni
Harvard Kennedy School alumni
Air Command and Staff College alumni
Dwight D. Eisenhower School for National Security and Resource Strategy alumni
Living people
Recipients of the Defense Distinguished Service Medal
Year of birth missing (living people)